The City of Swan Hill was a local government area in northwestern Victoria, Australia, along the Murray River.

History

Swan Hill was originally part of the Swan Hill Road District, which initially covered most of northwestern Victoria, and was incorporated in 1862. The Shire of Castle Donnington severed from the district on 30 May 1893, and on 31 May 1904, the Castle Donnington municipality was renamed and gazetted as the Shire of Swan Hill.

A small part of the shire, in and near the town of Swan Hill, severed on 31 May 1939, and was incorporated as the Borough of Swan Hill, which became the City of Swan Hill on 12 March 1965.

On 20 January 1995, the City of Swan Hill was abolished, and along with the Shire of Swan Hill and the Tresco district of the Shire of Kerang, was merged into the newly created Rural City of Swan Hill.

Wards
Swan Hill was not divided into wards, and its nine councillors represented all electors in the city.

Population 

* Estimate in the 1958 Victorian Year Book.

References

External links
 Victorian Places - Swan Hill

Swan Hill City
1939 establishments in Australia